is a 2012 anime series based on the light novels written by Mikage Kasuga and illustrated by Miyama-Zero. The series follows high school student Yoshiharu Sagara, who finds himself in an alternative timeline during the Sengoku period. Having rescued Nobuna Oda, a teenaged girl version of his world's Oda Nobunaga, he helps Nobuna in her ambition to conquer and unite Japan under her rule.

The anime aired from July 9, 2012 to September 24, 2012 at 1:05 a.m. on TV Tokyo. The anime is jointly produced by Studio Gokumi and Madhouse and directed by Yūji Kumazawa, scripted and produced by Masami Suzuki and music by Yasuharu Takanashi.

Names in this article are re-written in Western format, i.e. the given name appears before the clan name. In Japanese format, however, family name appears before the given name, a fact that English dub of the series (Sentai Filmworks) did not take into proper consideration.

Episode list

External links
 

The Ambition of Oda Nobuna